The Beigua Natural Regional Park (in Italian Parco naturale regionale del Beigua) is a natural park located in province of Savona and the Metropolitan City of Genoa, both in Liguria (Italy). It's the largest protected area of the region. It gets the name from the highest mountain of the area, Monte Beigua.

History
The natural park was established by the l.r. (regional law, in Italian legge regionale) nr. 16 April the 9th 1985 as modified by the l.r. nr. 12 February the 22nd 1995.

During March 2005 the Beigua Geopark was recognised as a part of the European Geoparks Network.

Geography 

The park encompasses three SCIs and one SPA of the Natura 2000 network:
 Foresta della Deiva – Torrente Erro (SCI code: IT1321313)  788 hectares,
 Pian della Badia (Tiglieto)  (SCI code: IT1330620) 250 hectares,
 Beigua – Monte Dente – Gargassa – Pavaglione (SCI code: IT1331402) almost 17.000 hectares,
 Beigua-Turchino (SPA code: IT1331578)  9960 hectares.

The geopark is wider than the Natural Regional Park and reaches  of protected territory.

Main summits of the park 
Among the summits located in the park can be cited Monte Beigua (1287 m), Bric del Dente (1107 m), Cima Fontanaccia (1153 m), Monte Rama (1150 m), Monte Reixa (1183 m) and Monte Sciguello (1103 m).

Concerned municipalities 

The natural park is shared among the following municipalities:
Arenzano, Campo Ligure, Cogoleto, Genova, Masone, Rossiglione, Sassello, Stella, Tiglieto, Varazze

Geology 
The park offers a wide range of geological features, most of them tied to a portion of Jurassic oceanic crust modified during the Alpine orogeny. Among the predominant rocks of the area can be cited gabbros, peridotites and serpentinites, here and there covered by pillow basalts and latter sedimentary and metamorphic layers. Several serpentinite quarries, active in the past, are now abandoned.

Wildlife 

Some rare plants of the park are Viola bertolonii, Cerastium utriense, Asplenium cuneifolium, Daphne cneorum, Cheilantes marantae.
Mountain mires and wetlands host locally endangered species of amphibians as alpine newt, northern crested newt and Malpolon monspessulanus. In the park are very common larger animals as wild boars, roe and fallow deers.

Hiking 
Around 500 km of footpaths are available within the park, that is crossed from west to east by the Alta Via dei Monti Liguri, a long-distance trail from Ventimiglia (province of Imperia) to Bolano (province of La Spezia).

Bibliography

Related articles 
 Cascata del Serpente
 Lago dell'Antenna

References 

Regional parks of Italy
Parks in Liguria
Geoparks in Italy
Protected areas established in 1985
Protected areas established in 1995
Protected areas of the Apennines
1985 establishments in Italy
1995 establishments in Italy